Venus on Trial is a 1941 German drama film directed by Hans H. Zerlett and starring Hannes Stelzer, Hansi Knoteck, and Paul Dahlke. The film was part of the Nazis' campaign against 'degenerate art', and depicts the trial of a young artist who has resisted the trend towards it.

The film was made by Bavaria Film at their Emelka Studios in Munich. The film's sets were designed by the art directors Max Seefelder, Hans Sohnle and Wilhelm Vorwerg.

Plot 
The film is set in the 1920s. Peter Brake, a sculptor, believes modern art to be decadent. He creates a neoclassical-style statue of Venus, which he then buries in a Bavarian field in order to protect the identity of Charlotte, the woman who modelled for it. When it is dug up, experts believe that Venus vom Acker ('Venus of the Fields') is an ancient statue made by Praxiteles.

Peter is unable to prove that he is the creator of the statue, as the only person able to verify his claim is the model. He tries to keep her out of the matter, as she is now a respectable housewife. Ultimately, however, she decides to come forward as a witness.

Cast

Role as propaganda 
The character of Peter Brake may be loosely based on Arno Breker, whose work was endorsed by the Nazi authorities.

The filmmakers used sculptures that had been seized by the government, including Ernst Kirchner's Das Paar ('The Couple'), Otto Freundlich's Kopf (Head), and Marg Moll's Tanzerin (Dancer), as props.

The art experts who misidentify Brake's sculpture are all coded as effete, homosexual or Jewish, etc. Susan Felleman suggests that the film's attempt at propaganda were weak, finding that its portrayals of a 'decadent' Berlin nightlife and the character of Benjamin Hecht (a Jewish art dealer) significantly more interesting than those Brake and his circle.

References

Bibliography

External links 
 

1941 films
1941 comedy-drama films
German comedy-drama films
Films of Nazi Germany
German black-and-white films
1940s German-language films
Films directed by Hans H. Zerlett
Films about fictional painters
Nazi propaganda films
Films set in 1930
Bavaria Film films
Films set in the 1920s
Films set in Bavaria
1940s German films